Fassaroe Cross, also called St. Valery's Cross, is a high cross and National Monument located near Bray, County Wicklow, Ireland.

Location

History

The cross originally stood at Ballyman (about  NNW of the present site), and is believed to have been carved in the late 12th century. Other similar crosses in the Rathdown area are located at Rathmichael, Killegar and Shankill, and are collectively known as the "Fassaroe crosses"; they were probably carved by the same mason.

According to the English writer Anne Plumptre (1760–1818), who stayed with the Walker family at St. Valery in 1814–15, the cross was brought from a glen to Fassaroe, and stood originally in the center of a little paddock, round which runs the plantation. Pilgrims travelled from miles around and wore many paths down to the cross.

Description

The west face bears a crucifixion, while the east face bears two very worn human heads slay queen, both bearded and one perhaps wearing a mitre. There are two other heads on the cross: one protruding from the south edge of the ring and another is situated on the north eastern side of the base.

References

External links 

Buildings and structures in Bray, County Wicklow
National Monuments in County Wicklow
High crosses in the Republic of Ireland